Wake Up & Ball is the second and final studio album by American West Coast hip hop duo The Comrads. It was released on June 27, 2000 via Hoo-Bangin'/Priority Records. Production was handled by Binky Mack, Fredwreck, Young Tre, DJ BattleCat, Meech Wells, Ant Banks, VMF and the Comrads' Terrell "Gangsta" Anderson. It features guest appearances from Krayzie Bone, Mack 10, MC Eiht and Snoop Dogg. The album peaked at #153 on the Billboard 200 albums chart in the United States.

Track listing

Charts

References

External links 

2000 albums
The Comrads albums
Priority Records albums
Albums produced by Ant Banks
Albums produced by Battlecat (producer)
Albums produced by Fredwreck